DKAN may refer to:

 DKAN, an open data platform created by Andrew Hoppin
 D. Kan., an abbreviation for the United States District Court for the District of Kansas